Elina Reinold (born on 28 December 1971 in Tallinn) is an Estonian actress.

In 1994 she graduated from Estonian Academy of Music and Theatre's Drama School. 1993-2006 she worked at Estonian Drama Theatre. Since 2006 she is a freelance actress. Besides theatrical roles she has also played on several films and television series.

Filmography

 1995: Wikmani poisid (role: Maila)
 1994–1996: Õnne 13 (role: Kristi)
 1999: Lurjus (role: Evelin Timmer)
 2001: Ladybirds' Christmas  (voice role: Leonardo the Cricket)
 2001: Head käed (role: Nurse)
 2006: Lotte from Gadgetville (role: Susumu)
 2007: Kelgukoerad (role: Kärt)
 2010 and 2013: Kättemaksukontor (role: Mailis in 2010; role: Freya Narvik in 2013-) 
 2011: Lotte and the Moonstone Secret (roles: Ernst the Spider and Uno the Tiny Illness Man)
 2012: Seenelkäik (role: Viivi Kägu)
 2016: Päevad, mis ajasid segadusse (role: Malle)
 2018: Tuliliilia (role: Witch)

References

Living people
1971 births
Estonian stage actresses
Estonian film actresses
Estonian television actresses
Estonian voice actresses
20th-century Estonian actresses
21st-century Estonian actresses
Estonian Academy of Music and Theatre alumni
Actresses from Tallinn